is a dam located in the town of Nakanojō, Agatsuma District, Gunma Prefecture, Japan.

Access
Rose Queen Kotsu
From Naganohara-Kusatsuguchi Station

External links

Dams in Gunma Prefecture
Dams completed in 1956